La Chevrotière is a tributary of the northwest shore of the Saint-Laurent river, descending in the municipality of Portneuf, Saint-Gilbert and Deschambault-Grondines, in the Portneuf, in the administrative region of Capitale-Nationale, in Quebec, in Canada.

The La Chevrotière river valley is mainly served by the route 138 which runs along the northwest shore of the St. Lawrence River and the route 363 which passes on the north side of this valley. The secondary roads serving this area are Chemin du 3e rang, Chemin Gravel, Rue Principale, Route du Moulin, Route d'Irlande and Chemin du rang de la Chapelle.

Agriculture is the main economic activity in the sector; forestry, second.

The surface of the La Chevrotière river (except the rapids areas) is generally frozen from the beginning of December to the end of March; however, safe circulation on the ice is generally from late December to early March. The water level of the river varies with the seasons and the precipitation; the spring flood occurs in March or April.

Geography 

The La Chevrotière river is located on the north shore of the Saint-Laurent river, halfway between Trois-Rivières and Quebec, more precisely between the slopes of the Sainte-Anne River (to the west) and the Portneuf River (to the east).

The La Chevrotière river has its source in a marsh area near the chemin de rang de la Chapelle in the municipality of Portneuf and south-east of Domaine-Alouette.

  to the south, winding through the forested area, up to the path of rang de la Chapelle;
  to the south while winding in the forest zone, up to the road to Southern Ireland, corresponding to the discharge (coming from the northeast) of the stream at Godin's;
  towards the southwest by winding in agricultural and forestry zone, until the road of the Mill;
  to the south in agricultural and forestry areas, to a stream (coming from the west);
  to the south, winding heavily through agricultural and forestry areas, passing from the west side of the village of Saint-Gilbert to rue Principale;
  towards the south-east winding through an agricultural area by crossing the Gravel road, then the third range road, up to Le Petit Bras (coming from the North);
  to the south by winding in an agricultural zone, then branching west to cross the route 363 (route Dussault), then south up to the Moulin stream (coming from the West);
  towards the south-east in an agricultural zone along the Dussault road, to the railway bridge located very close (i.e. on the east side) of the hamlet La Chevrotière;
  to the southwest in the agricultural zone, forming a loop to the southwest, collecting the Lefebvre stream (coming from the southwest), passing under the Saint-Éloi Bridge (route Julien) then under the two bridges of autoroute 40, forming a three loops to the northeast and one to the west before crossing the route 138, to its mouth.

Toponymy 

Its name is taken from François de Chavigny Lachevrotière, who became lord of the fief of La Tesserie in 1674 - in 1698 this fief was named La Chevrotière.

The toponym "La Chevrotière" was formalized on March 9, 1988, at the Place Names Bank of the Commission de toponymie du Québec.

See also 
 Portneuf Regional County Municipality
 Moulin de La Chevrotière
 List of rivers of Quebec

References

Bibliography 
 

Rivers of Capitale-Nationale